Rising Storm is a stand-alone expansion pack to Red Orchestra 2: Heroes of Stalingrad developed by Tripwire Interactive in conjunction with the modding community. The title focuses on the Pacific campaign of World War II. Announced in May 2010, the game was scheduled for release in 2013. The beta went live on May 8 that year. A sequel, titled Rising Storm 2: Vietnam was released in 2017.

Gameplay
 
Rising Storm is a realistic first person shooter. All of the core gameplay mechanics from Red Orchestra 2 are present, such as the cover system and bullet drop. Rising Storm brings in a whole new arsenal of weapons, that relate to the American and Japanese weaponry used in the Pacific Theater, such as the M1 Garand and the Type 38 rifle. Gameplay has been described by Tripwire as asymmetrical, due to the Japanese having inferior weaponry to the Americans to maintain historical accuracy. To balance the teams out, the Japanese are given the Knee Mortar, along with the ability to plant grenades as booby traps, and being able to launch Banzai charges at the Americans, which in turn deals suppression onto the Americans while the Japanese suffer less from suppression themselves.

Rising Storm features four playable factions, including the United States Marine Corps, the U.S. Army, the Imperial Japanese Army, and the Special Naval Landing Forces. The game takes the player around the Pacific with maps varying from the Battle of Peleliu, with a desert-island type environment, to the Battle of Saipan at Charan Kanoa, an urban environment, to the Battle of Iwo Jima and the like.

Rising Storm also comes with all multiplayer content from Red Orchestra 2: Heroes of Stalingrad.

On September 26, 2013, the Island assault content pack was added, bring with it a multiplayer campaign previously seen in Red Orchestra 2: Heroes of Stalingrad.

In November 2014, a new free content update was released, featuring 1 new map, and changes to some other maps. The new map being Demyansk.

In September 2014, the Armored Assault free content update was released. adding in 2 new maps, Kobura and Tula outskirts. And 2 new tanks, being the Soviet T-70 Light tank and the German Panzer III Medium tank. And a new weapon was added in, the MG-42 German machine gun. The update also changed the map Arad 2, which was updated to showcase the T-70 and Panzer III tanks.

Development
First announced on May 18, 2010, Rising Storm was developed between Tripwire Interactive and the modding community.

Reception
Rising Storm earned strongly positive reception from fans and media alike. PC Gamer magazine gave it a rating of 86/100, calling it "A gritty, brutal WWII shooter that uses its scale, setting, and fidelity to great effect." The game was also well received on Metacritic, attaining 82/100 from critics and an 8.5 from users.

Sequel 
Rising Storm 2: Vietnam is a sequel to Rising Storm and focuses on the Vietnam War. It was developed by Tripwire Interactive and Antimatter Games. Announced on June 17, 2015, the game was released May 30, 2017.

References

External links
 

2013 video games
First-person shooter multiplayer online games
Multiplayer online games
Video games with Steam Workshop support
Unreal Engine games
Windows games
Windows-only games
Video games developed in the United States
Video game expansion packs
Video games scored by Lennie Moore
Video games set in Japan
Video games set in Oceania
Video games set in the Northern Mariana Islands
Video games set in Palau
Video games set in Russia
Video games set in the Solomon Islands
Video games set in the Soviet Union
Video games about the United States Marine Corps
Pacific War video games
Tripwire Interactive games